Hiroshige Koyama (1937–2016) was a Japanese botanist and specialist of Asteraceae.

Koyamacalia, a genus of East Asian plants in the groundsel tribe Senecioneae, was named for Koyama. It is listed as a synonym of Parasenecio.

Works 
 Cytotaxonomic Studies of Compositae 3: On the Species Problems in Japanese Cacalia Hastata and Its Allies by Hiroshige Koyama - 1968
 On Cacalia Yatabei and Its Related Species by Hiroshige Koyama - 1968
 Taxonomic studies on the tribe Senecioneae of Eastern Asia by Hiroshige Koyama - 1969
 Phytogeography of Some Flowering Plants of the Tsushima Islands by Hiroshige Koyama - 1970
 Blumea Conspicua, as a Species Endemic to the Ryukyu Islands by Hiroshige Koyama - 1974
 Notes on some species of Chinese Cacalia 3 by Hiroshige Koyama - 1979
 Natural history researches of the Abukuma mountains  and Its Adjacent Regions by Hiroshige Koyama, Hiroshige Koyama - 1995
 Flora and Fauna of the Imperial Palace, Tokyo by Hiroshige Koyama - 2000

References

External links 

20th-century Japanese botanists
1937 births
2016 deaths
21st-century Japanese botanists